Calytrix chrysantha is a species of plant in the myrtle family Myrtaceae that is endemic to Western Australia.

It blooms between December and February producing yellow star shaped flowers

Found on flat areas of the Geraldton Sandplains in the Wheatelt and Mid West regions of Western Australia where it grows in sandy soils.

References

Plants described in 1987
chrysantha
Flora of Western Australia